Anna Nee En Deivam is a shelved Indian Tamil-language film directed by C. V. Sridhar and produced by Jayaar Movies. The film stars M. G. Ramachandran, Latha, Sangeeta, M. N. Nambiar and V. S. Raghavan.

Cast 

M. G. Ramachandran as Raju
Latha as Chitra
Sangeeta as Seeta
M. N. Nambiar as Prakash
V. S. Raghavan as Chitra's father
Pandari Bai as Raju and Seeta's mother

Production 
The project was announced in 1976, when C. V. Sridhar discussed his decision to direct a film with M. G. Ramachandran after the success of their previous collaboration Urimaikural (1974). While making Anna Nee En Deivam, Sridhar was simultaneously making Meenava Nanban with Ramachandran. The film was produced by Sankaran and Aarumugam from Tenkasi with financier Duraisamy providing finance. However, due to the latter's political commitments and his involvement in other projects, the film was delayed. It was ultimately shelved after 4,000 ft of the portions being canned, as Ramachandran retired from filmmaking as well as acting in 1978 to take up his duties as the Chief Minister of Tamil Nadu however he completed acting in Meenava Nanban.

Future 

K. Bhagyaraj incorporated approximately 4000 feet of the film as a new plot for Avasara Police 100 which released in 1990. M. N. Nambiar, Sangeetha and V. S. Raghavan played the same characters from Anna Nee En Deivam as continuation in Avasara Police 100 as well.

References 

1970s Tamil-language films
1970s unfinished films
Unreleased Tamil-language films